Bubba Foods is an American producer of frozen burgers founded in 2000. Their primary product, Bubba burger, is produced using USDA Choice beef chuck. They have added new products such as turkey burgers, veggie burgers, and Snack Bites.

Company Description

Based in Jacksonville, Floria, Bubba Foods, LLC employs 150 people across all of its sites. The corporate family consists of two entities.

History

BUBBA burger was created by Walter "Bubba" Eaves in 1995. Distribution of Bubba Burgers began with grocery stores in the south-eastern United States and then expanded across the United States.

Products

Bubba Foods' product line includes: 

Beef Burger options:

 Original BUBBA burger;
 Sweet Onion BUBBA burger;
 Angus Beef BUBBA burger;
 Bacon Cheddar BUBBA burger;
 Jalapeño BUBBA burger;
 Jalapeño Cheddar BUBBA burger
 BUBBA burger Sliders;
 The Big BUBBA burger;
 All-Natural BUBBA burger;
 Reduced Fat BUBBA burger;
 Grass-Fed BUBBA burger;
 Wagyu BUBBA burger.

Turkey Burger options:

 All-Natural Turkey BUBBA burger;
 Turkey with Monterey Jack BUBBA burger;
 Turkey with Onion BUBBA burger.

Veggie Burger options:

 Original Veggie BUBBA burger;
 Veggie with Beets BUBBA burger;
 Veggie with White Beans BUBBA burger;
 Latin Grill Veggie BUBBA burger.

Snack Bites:

 Snack Bites - Cheesy Chicken Jalapeño;
 Snack Bites - Cheddar and Beef.

See also
 List of frozen food brands

References

External links
 

 Food and drink companies established in 2000
 Frozen food brands
 Manufacturing companies based in Jacksonville, Florida
 Food manufacturers of the United States
2000 establishments in Florida